Hugo Leonardo Pereira Nascimento (born June 6, 1987) is a Brazilian footballer currently unattached, he is known as Leonardo.

References

External links
 
 
 pepsifoci.hu: Honfitársat kapott Leandro Debrecenben, 2009-02-11 

1987 births
Living people
Footballers from Rio de Janeiro (city)
Association football defenders
Brazilian footballers
Brazilian expatriate footballers
Clube 15 de Novembro players
Debreceni VSC players
Expatriate footballers in Hungary
Brazilian expatriate sportspeople in Hungary